Sir Frederick Acclom Milbank, 1st Baronet (21 April 1820 – 28 April 1898), was a British Liberal Member of Parliament.

Career
Milbank was elected to the House of Commons for the North Riding of Yorkshire in 1865, a seat he held until 1885, and then represented Richmond until 1886. On 16 May 1882 he was created a Baronet, of Well in the County of York, and of Hart in the County of Durham.

Milbank died in April 1898, aged 78.

Family
He married in 1844 Alexina Harriet Don, daughter of Sir Alexander Don, 6th Baronet. They were parents of:
 William Harry Vane Milbank (1848–1892), stepfather of Albert de Belleroche.
 Powlett Charles John Milbank (1852–1918), who succeeded his father as 2nd Baronet.
 Alice Frederica Milbank (d.1902), who married in 1888 Sir David Dale, 1st Baronet.
 Wilhelmina Louisa Milbank

Notes

References
Kidd, Charles, Williamson, David (editors). Debrett's Peerage and Baronetage (1990 edition). New York: St Martin's Press, 1990,

External links 
 

1820 births
1898 deaths
Baronets in the Baronetage of the United Kingdom
Liberal Party (UK) MPs for English constituencies
UK MPs 1865–1868
UK MPs 1868–1874
UK MPs 1874–1880
UK MPs 1880–1885
UK MPs 1885–1886